Mauricio González de la Garza (October 6, 1923–1995) was a Mexican journalist, writer and music composer.

Life and career
González de la Garza was born in Nuevo Laredo, Tamaulipas, Mexico. He earned Bachelors and master's degrees in Philosophy from the Universidad Autónoma de México, as well a psychology Doctorate.

He wrote a nationally syndicated newspaper column, in Mexico, under the title "Mauricio Dice"  (Mauricio Says). The column was a regular feature in the national daily Excélsior, amongst others. During the presidency of José López Portillo, the publication of 'Última Llamada' (Last Call) forced González de la Garza to live in exile in Falfurrias, Texas.

An accomplished pianist and composer in his own right, González de la Garza wrote several musical compositions, achieving widespread national success with "Polvo enamorado" ("Dust in Love"), interpreted by José José.

Partial list of published works
 Río de la misericordia (1965)
 El Padre Prior (1971)
 Rey de oros (1972)
 Abel o Purgatorio de Amor (1977, novel)
 Última Llamada
 Carta Abierta a Miguel de la Madrid, con copia a los mexicanos (1988)
 El milagro azul (1988)
 México rumbo a México (1993)
 De Puebla los Fulgores (1995)
 Soneto (1990)
 Essay about Walt Whitman

References

External links
 Memories about my sister: Josefina González de la Garza

1923 births
1995 deaths
Mexican journalists
Male journalists
Mexican composers
20th-century composers
People from Tamaulipas
People from Brooks County, Texas
20th-century journalists
National Autonomous University of Mexico alumni